The  is a university press affiliated with the University of Tokyo in Japan. It was founded in 1951, following the post-World War II reorganization of the university.

The press is currently a member of the Association of University Presses.

Honors
 Japan Foundation: Special Prize, 1990.

Location
The headquarters of the University of Tokyo Press is located on the main campus of the University of Tokyo, at 7-3-1 Hongō, Bunkyō, Tokyo.

References

External links
 Official site 

Book publishing companies in Tokyo
University presses of Japan
1951 establishments in Japan
University of Tokyo
Publishing companies established in 1951